Margaret Simwanza Sitta (born 24 July 1946) is a Tanzanian politician belonging to the ruling Chama Cha Mapinduzi party, 
She was elected as a member of parliament for Urambo, serving from 2015 to 2020. She previously served as Minister of Education and Vocational Training as well as Minister of Community Development, Gender and Children. Prior to joining politics, she worked as a teacher in government schools.

Early life and education
Margaret Simwanza Sitta was born on 24 July 1946.She was educated at Tabora Town Primary School from 1954 to 1957, then attended Ussoke Girls Middle School from 1958 to 1961. She completed her schooling at the Tabora Girls Secondary School in 1965 and received her Certificate of Grade "A" from the Mpwapwa Teachers College in 1967; she later received her diploma at the same college in 1985. She finally received a Ba ED Hons-Degree at the University of Dar es Salaam in 1988

Career
Following teaching school, she worked as a Secondary School Teacher - at Tabora Girls, Azania, Mwanza and Forodhani throughout the years 1968 to 1980. In 1980, she held District Education Officer positions of Urambo, Moshi and Kinondoni Municipal from 1990 to 1995. In 1996, she became Head of Workers Education Department- DSM, hiered by Trade Unions Confederation of Tanzania(TUCTA) Institution where she worked for four years since 1996,
In 2000, she served Ministry of Education and Vocational Training as Officer-Office of the Commissioner of EducationDSM,
She became a minister of Educationand Vocational Training from 2006 to 2008, She continued to hold her minister position but this time was of Ministry of Community Development, Gender and Children office from 2008 to 2010.

She was the president of the Tanzania Teachers’ Union before being appointed as Minister of Education and Vocational Training by President Jakaya Kikwete in 2006.

Political career

Margaret Simwanza Sitta first took on a political role in 2005 when she became a member of Chama Cha Mapinduzi (CCM) party. She was nominated to the parliament in 2005 representing Urambo constituency,. She served CCM as a Member of Ward Political Committee-Msasani DSM from 2005 to 2010 and latter as a Member-NAtional Executive Council in 2017. From 2012 todate she have being serving her political party as a Member-NEC Urambo.
She was reelected again in 2010 as a member of parliament and again in 2015 holding her constituency.

Family life
Margaret Simwanza Sitta married Samuel John Sitta who was the Speaker of the National Assembly of Tanzania from 2005 to 2010 and Minister of East African Cooperation from 2010 to 2015.
Samuel Sitta died at around 3am on 7 November 2016 at TUM School of Medicine (Klinikum rechts der Isar) in Munich (Germany) after falling ill for a short period.

References

1946 births
Living people
Chama Cha Mapinduzi MPs
Tanzanian MPs 2000–2005
Tanzanian MPs 2005–2010
Tanzanian MPs 2010–2015
Tanzanian Roman Catholics
20th-century Tanzanian women politicians
21st-century Tanzanian women politicians
Women legislative speakers